Luodong is a railway station in Luodong Township, Yilan County, Taiwan served by Taiwan Railways.

Overview 
The station has one island platform and one side platform. The station building is located above the platforms and is accessible from both the station front and rear. It is a major station on the Yilan line and is a second-tier station. Many express trains, including the Taroko Express, stop at this station.

History 
1919-03-24: The station opened for service.
1985-10-24: The current palace-style station opens for service.

Around the station 
 Dongshan River Water Park
 Luodong Bo-ai Hospital
 Luodong Forestry Culture Park
 Luodong Sports Park
 Luodong Night Market
 Luodong Township center
 Zhongshan Park
 Luodong Exercise Park
 Forestry Bureau, Luodong Area Branch
 Shengmu Hospital

See also
 List of railway stations in Taiwan

References

External links 

1919 establishments in Taiwan
Railway stations in Yilan County, Taiwan
Railway stations opened in 1919
Railway stations served by Taiwan Railways Administration